Lufenuron is the active ingredient in the veterinary flea control medication Program, and one of the two active ingredients in the flea, heartworm, ringworm and anthelmintic medicine milbemycin oxime/lufenuron (Sentinel).

Lufenuron is stored in the animal's body fat and transferred to adult fleas through the host's blood when they feed. Adult fleas transfer it to their growing eggs through their blood, and to hatched larvae feeding on their excrement. It does not kill adult fleas.

Lufenuron, a benzoylurea pesticide, inhibits the production of chitin in insects.  Without chitin, a larval flea will never develop a hard outer shell (exoskeleton). With its inner organs exposed to air, the insect dies from dehydration soon after hatching or molting (shedding its old, smaller shell).

Lufenuron is also used to fight fungal infections, since fungus cell walls are about one third chitin.

Lufenuron is also sold as an agricultural pesticide for use against lepidopterans, eriophyid mites, and western flower thrips. It is an effective antifungal in plants.

References

External links
 

Veterinary drugs
Insecticides
Ureas
Antifungals
Chloroarenes
Organofluorides
Phenol ethers
Benzamides
Dog medications
Fungicides
Fluoroarenes
Trifluoromethyl compounds